Hédi Temessy (Hedvig Temesi; 6 May 1925 – 29 May 2001) was a Hungarian actress. Active for over 50 years, she appeared on stage, in films, and on television. Her significant roles include playing Márta in Gergely Csiky's The Grandmother (A nagymama).

Early life
Hedvig Temesi was born on 6 May 1925, in Budapest. Her mother was originally from Alsace-Lorraine and her maternal grandfather was a master iron worker, who had immigrated to France from Graz. As a child, she learned German from her mother. After completing her education at the State Teacher Training Institute, she enrolled in the National Actors' School in Budapest just before the start of World War II. Three months before completing her training, Temesi refused to take the compulsory political courses, as her teaching certificate confirmed she had already successfully been examination on those subjects and she wanted to take more practical courses. The school dropped her from the roles, but Márton Rátkai was able to intervene and get her accepted to a school directed by the Actors Association, from which she graduated in 1948.

Career
In 1950, Temessy became a member of the Youth Theater and then played at Petőfi Theater. Between 1950 and 1977, she worked at a variety of theaters, including the Jókai Theater, the József Attila Theater, National Theater and the Thália Theater, among others. Because of her skill with German language, the fact that she was not a member of the Communist Party, and was a divorced, single mother, raising her son alone, Temessy was often fired from jobs as a suspicious enemy of the state, but her skill always allowed her to find theater work, even if she could not work in film.

Her first film role was as Mary Döry in the film Különös házasság (Strange Marriage, 1951), based on a novel by Kálmán Mikszáth of the same name. Three years would lapse before her next film, Rokonok (Relatives, 1954), directed by director Félix Máriássy. From the mid-1960, with a shift in the country's political climate, she began to attain roles in such film and television shows as Sellő a pecsétgyűrűn (Seller on Seal Ring, 1966), Egri csillagok (Stars of Eger, 1968), and Imposztorok (Impostors, 1969). In 1977, she was finally allowed to join the Hungarian Film Company Company, and increasingly from the 1970s, she found work with a new generation of directors who did not care about her private history.

Some of her most known stage roles include: Timea in Mór Jókai′s Az arany ember (The Golden Man); Márta in Gergely Csiky′s A nagymama (The Grandmother); Madelaine Béjart in Mikhail Bulgakov′s Az álszentek összeesküvése (The Conspiracy of Hypocrites); and Clara Zachanassian in Friedrich Dürrenmatt′s Az öreg hölgy látogatása (A Visit of the Old Lady). In 1985, she was awarded as the Best Female Actress by the jury of the Hungarian Feature Film Review for her portrayal in Őszi almanach (Autumn Almanac, 1984), directed by Béla Tarr.

Relationships
After Temessy divorced her husband, she began a relationship with actress Hilda Gobbi and they lived together from the late 1950s to 1960s in a home in Buda. Homosexuality was no longer a crime after 1961 but was classified as a mental illness. After Gobbi and Temessy ended their relationship, Gobbi became the partner of the writer Erzsébet Galgóczi.

Selected filmography

 Különös házasság (1951) - Mária,Dõry lánya
 Rokonok (1954) - Magdaléna
 Budapesti tavasz (1955)
 Egy pikoló világos (1955)
 Dani (1957)
 Álmatlan évek (1959) - Lisszauerné
 Légy jó mindhalálig (1960)
 A pénzcsináló (1964) - Kerényiné
 Másfél millió (1964)
 Utószezon (1967) - Péter anyja
 Sellö a pecsétgyürün I (1967) - Endrõdi Noémi
 Sellö a pecsétgyürün II (1967) - Endrõdy Noémi
 Egri csillagok (1968)
 Sziget a szárazföldön (1969) - Lakáscserélõ
 Imposztorok (1969) - Az Admirális neje
 Történelmi magánügyek (1970) - Nagy Mária
 Hatholdas rózsakert (1970) - Angyalka anyja
 Hangyaboly (1971) - Evelina
 Emberrablás magyar módra (1972) - Titkárnõ
 A magyar ugaron (1973) - Fábián anyja
 Lányarcok tükörben (1973) - Vendég a presszóban
 Tüzoltó utca 25. (1973)
 Football of the Good Old Days (1973) - Cserépkalapos nõ
 Itt járt Mátyás király (1973) - Szilágyi Erzsébet
 Ereszd el a szakállamat! (1975) - Lépoldné
 Autó (1975) - Lili anyja
 A Strange Role (1976) - Ágota kisasszony
 Man Without a Name (1976) - Énekesnõ
 Két pont között a legrövidebb görbe (1976) - Koós kapitány felesége
 Tükörképek (1976) - Bakosné, ápolt
 A kard (1977) - Muzeológus
 Pókfoci (1977) - Igazgatóhelyettes
 Just Like Home (1978) - Klára asszony
 BUÉK! (1978) - Kati nevelöanyja
 Áramütés (1979) - Rendésznö
 Mese habbal (1979) - Titkárnõ
 Ajándék ez a nap (1979) - Irén apjának korábbi partnere
 Veszélyes játékok (1980) - Schneider édesanyja
 Majd holnap (1980) - Márta néni
 Csontváry (1980) - Guest woman #1
 Boldog születésnapot, Marilyn! (1981) - Billy mamája
 Mephisto (1981) - Egy nagybankos neje
 Ballagás (1981) - Ybl Manci, fizikatanár
 Ripacsok (1981) - Róza
 The Vulture (1982) - Halmosné,Roska Mária
 Do not Panic, Major Kardos (1982) - Alexné
 Nyom nélkül (1982) - Idõs hölgy
 Talpra, Gyözö! (1983) - Ildikó, a nagymama
 Szerencsés Dániel (1983) - Mrs. Bakos
 The Revolt of Job (1983) - Róza, Jób felesége
 Bástyasétány hetvennégy (1984) - Elvira, jósnõ
 Almanac of Fall (1984) - Hédi
 Yerma (1984) - Magdalena
 The Red Countess (1985) - Gróf Andrássy Gyuláné
 Keserü igazság (1986)
 Akli Miklós (1986) - Szilvássyné
 Elysium (1986) - Zelma (voice)
 Vakvilágban (1987) - Károly anyja
 Laura (1987) - Berta
 Miss Arizona (1987) - (voice)
 Damnation (1988) - Cloakroom woman
 Soha, sehol, senkinek! (1988) - Nagymama
 Laurin (1989) - Olga
 Sweet Emma, Dear Böbe (1992) - Mária néni
 A skorpió megeszi az ikreket reggelire (1992) - Ella
 A csalás gyönyöre (1992)
 Kutyabaj (1992)
 Gyerekgyilkosságok (1993) - Szepessyné
 A gólyák mindig visszatérnek (1993) - Nagymama
 Indián tél (1993) - A Tanár úr felesége
 Köd (1994) - Hauserstück néni
 A Brooklyni testvér (1995)
 Európa messze van (1995) - Az állomásmester felesége
 Szeressük egymást, gyerekek! (1996) - macskanõ (segment "Ég a város, ég a ház is / Fire! Fire!)
 Levelek Perzsiából (1996) - Nagymama
 A világ legkisebb alapítványa (1997) - Countess Zsófi
 For My Baby (1997) - Martha Orgelbrand
 Film... (2000)
 Anarchisták (2001) - Fanni
 Hamvadó cigarettavég (2001) - (final film role)

Awards
 1941 Farkas–Ratkó Prize
 1949 Kossuth Prize
 1950 Republic of Hungary award for deserving artist (A Magyar Köztársaság Érdemes Művésze díj)
 1955 Republic of Hungary award for outstanding artist (A Magyar Köztársaság Kiváló Művésze díj)
 1977 SZOT prize
 1982 Worthy Artist
 1995 Officer of Order of Merit of the Republic of Hungary

References

Bibliography

External links

Temessy Hédi, port.hu

1925 births
2001 deaths
Actresses from Budapest
Hungarian film actresses
Hungarian stage actresses
Hungarian television actresses
Bisexual actresses
Hungarian bisexual people 
Hungarian LGBT actors
Recipients of the Order of Merit of the Republic of Hungary
Burials at Farkasréti Cemetery
20th-century Hungarian LGBT people